Sir Sagramore, also known as Sagramor and other variations of this name (including Sacremor,  Sacremors, Sagramour, Sagramoure, Sagremoir, Sagremor, Sagremore, Sagremoret, Sagrenoir, Saigremor, Saigremors, Saigremort, Segramor, Segramore, Segramors, Segramort, Segremor, Segremore, Seigramor, Seigramore, Sigamor, Sogremor and Sygramors), is a knight of the Round Table in Arthurian legend. He appears in many standalone and cyclical chivalric romances and other works, including some where he is the titular protagonist. Sagramore's characterisation varies from story to story, but generally he is characterised as a virtuous but hot-tempered knight who fights fiercely and ragefully.

Medieval and Renaissance literature
The earliest appearances of Sagramore, as Sagremor le Desreé (the Impetous), can be found in the 12th century stories by Chrétien de Troyes, where he is one of King Arthur's great warriors and a companion of Erec. Saigremor the ImpetuousIn the later Prose Tristan, Sagramore is portrayed as a great friend to the protagonist Tristan, and even the one who alerts the rest of the Round Table to his death. In the Post-Vulgate Cycle, the young Sagramore becomes the foster-brother of the child Mordred whose real identity is unknown at the time. In Le Morte d'Arthur, the prowess of Sagramore le Desirous (Sagramoure le Desyrous) varies from situation to situation; he usually serves to lose jousts to better knights, but at times he is a valiant fighter.

Sagramore is also the subject of a fragmentary German romance, Segremors, the surviving portions of which describe his journey to an island ruled by a fay and his undesired combat with his friend Gawain. In Jorge Ferreira de Vasconcelos' 16th-century Portuguese romance  (Triumphs of Sagramore) or Memorial das Proezas da Segunda Távola Redonda (Memorial of the Deeds of the Second Round Table), Sagramore and legendary British king Constantine III are fused into a single person, Sagramor Constantino, portrayed as the heir to Arthur who forms a new Round Table to fight the Saxons and keep the glory of Arthurian Britain.

Vulgate Cycle
According to the Lancelot-Grail (Vulgate) cycle, the father of Sagremor the Unruly was the King of Hungary named Vlask (renamed as Nabur the Unruly in the Post-Vulgate Suite du Merlin) and his mother was a daughter of an Eastern Roman ("Greek") Emperor Hadrian. Sagramore was actually an heir to the throne of Constantinople, but his father died while he was still young, and his mother accepted the proposal of King Brandegoris of Estangore in Britain. When he was fifteen, Sagramore traveled to Britain to join them and help Arthur fight the Saxon invaders. Upon arrival in Britain, Sagramore immediately engages the enemy forces in a battle at Camelot with aid from Arthur's nephew Gawain and his brothers: they are all subsequently knighted by Arthur. After the Saxons are defeated, and having personally slain some of their kings, he later participates in Arthur's other early wars such as these against Claudas and Galahaut.

The Lancelot-Grail describes him as a good knight, but quick to anger. When fighting, he would go into a frenzy not unlike the Irish hero Cúchulainn's warp spasm; when he came down, he would feel ill and hungry. He gains a number of nicknames, including "the Hothead" (li Desreez) and "the Desired" (le Désiré). Kay gave him another nickname, "Dead Youth" (Morte Jeune), due to how he would sometimes go into epilepsy-like fits.

The cycle recounts a number of his adventures, often centered around rescuing damsels, and mentions that he had a daughter by one of his paramours who was raised at Arthur's court by Guinevere. In the Livre d'Artus version he also becomes a champion of the pagan queen Sebile, whom he marries after she converts to Christianity for his sake. His half-sister, Brandegoris' beautiful daughter Claire, falls in love with Bors and sleeps with him; their child is Elyan the White, who too joins the Round Table before returning to take the throne of Constantinople. Eventually, Sagramore dies by Mordred's hand as one of Arthur's last remaining warriors in their final battle.

Modern fiction
Sagramore appears with some regularity in modern Arthurian literature and other fiction. 
 In Alfred, Lord Tennyson's "Merlin and Vivien", one of the Idylls of the King, he stumbles into bed with a maiden, thinking he is in his own room; to save their reputation the two strangers wed, but their purity and goodness make their marriage a happy one. 
 Mark Twain characterised Sagramore (as "Sir Sagramor le Desirous") as an angry, backwards knight in A Connecticut Yankee in King Arthur's Court (portrayed by William Bendix in the 1949 film version), who challenges the Yankee to a duel to the death and is defeated by the Yankee's modern weaponry; his armour, later displayed in a museum featuring a gunshot hole inflicted by the Yankee, serves as a setpiece to the start of the story. 
 The knight appears in the musical Camelot and was played by Peter Bromilow in the film version. 
 In Bernard Cornwell's The Winter King, "Sagramor" is a fierce Numidian veteran of the old Roman army who serves as Arthur's trusted chief cavalry officer, having traveled to Britain after the collapse of the Western Roman Empire. In the book version, he is the only black person in Britain known to the protagonist-narrator Derfel (there are many other black characters in the TV adapatation).

References

Sources
Norris J. Lacy et al. The New Arthurian Encyclopedia. New York: Garland, 1991.

Arthurian characters
Fictional Hungarian people
Fictional princes
Knights of the Round Table
Legendary Romans